Heartburn is a 1986 American comedy-drama film directed and produced by Mike Nichols, starring Meryl Streep and Jack Nicholson. The screenplay, written by Nora Ephron, is based on her novel of the same name, a semi-biographical account of her marriage to Carl Bernstein.

The song "Coming Around Again" was written and performed by Carly Simon, and became one of her biggest hits. The song reached No. 18 on the Billboard Hot 100 and No. 5 on the Billboard Adult Contemporary chart, and was soon followed by the album of the same name. The film was released in the United States on July 25, 1986.

Plot
Manhattan food writer Rachel Samstat and Washington, D.C. political columnist Mark Forman meet at a mutual friend's wedding. Both have been married before and Mark has a reputation for being a serial womanizer. After a whirlwind courtship, the two marry, despite Rachel's reservations.

They purchase a dilapidated townhouse and Rachel struggles to adapt to being a wife in Washington's political high society. The ongoing renovations of their house create some stress in Mark and Rachel's marriage, but they are brought closer together when she discovers she is pregnant. Rachel experiences a difficult labor in which the baby's life is briefly threatened, but she gives birth to a healthy baby girl, Annie.

Soon after, Rachel discovers evidence of Mark's extramarital affair with socialite Thelma Rice during her pregnancy with her second child. She leaves him and takes their daughter to New York, where she moves in with her father and gets her job back as a food writer.

Although Rachel insists that she has left him for good, she is dismayed when he fails to call her after several days. She inadvertently leads a burglar to a group therapy session she is attending in her therapist's apartment; he robs the group and takes Rachel's wedding ring. Just after, Mark arrives and asks her to come back, insisting he will never see Thelma again.

Rachel gives birth to their second child, but struggles to fully forgive Mark. She spreads a nasty rumor about Thelma having an infection (possibly herpes) but is caught out by Mark.

The New York police return Rachel's wedding ring after they catch the burglar. When she takes it to the jeweler's to get the stone tightened, she discovers that Mark has bought a very expensive necklace, which coincides with Thelma's birthday. Realizing that he has returned to the affair, Rachel sells her wedding ring and leaves with both her children for New York, this time for good.

Cast

 Meryl Streep as Rachel Samstat
 Jack Nicholson as Mark Forman
 Stockard Channing as Julie Siegel
 Jeff Daniels as Richard
 Miloš Forman as Dmitri
 Steven Hill as Harry Samstat
 Catherine O'Hara as Betty
 Mamie Gummer as Annie Forman
 Joanna Gleason as Diana
 Anna Maria Horsford as Della
 Richard Masur as Arthur Siegel
 Maureen Stapleton as Vera
 Mercedes Ruehl as Eve
 Kevin Spacey as Subway Thief
 Dana Ivey as Wedding Speaker
 Karen Akers as Thelma Rice
 Jack Gilpin as Ellis
 Kenneth Welsh as Dr. Appel
 Natasha Lyonne as Rachel's niece

Production
The film was shot on location in Manhattan, Washington, D.C. and Alexandria, Virginia. Jack Nicholson replaced Mandy Patinkin after a day of shooting. Nora Ephron's screenplay is based on her 1983 autobiographical novel of the same name, and inspired by her tempestuous second marriage to Carl Bernstein and his affair with Margaret Jay, the daughter of former British Prime Minister James Callaghan.

The film's music was composed by Carly Simon. Her songs "Coming Around Again" and "Itsy Bitsy Spider" are included in the 1987 Grammy-nominated album Coming Around Again.

Release

Critical response
On Rotten Tomatoes, the film holds an approval rating of 45% based on 22 reviews, with an average rating of 5.6/10. The site's critics consensus reads: "Despite an astonishing collection of talent across the board, Heartburns aimless plot inspires mild indigestion instead of romantic ardor." On Metacritic, the film has a weighted average score of 49 out of 100, based on 11 critics, indicating "mixed or average reviews". Audiences polled by CinemaScore gave the film an average grade of "B−" on an A+ to F scale.

Roger Ebert of the Chicago Sun-Times called it "a bitter, sour movie about two people who are only marginally interesting" and placed much of the blame on screenwriter Nora Ephron, who "should have based her story on somebody else's marriage. That way, she could have provided the distance and perspective that good comedy needs." He felt "she apparently had too much anger to transform the facts into entertaining fiction."

Variety thought it was "a beautifully crafted film with flawless performances and many splendid moments, yet the overall effect is a bit disappointing" and added, "While the day-to-day details are drawn with a striking clarity, Ephron's script never goes much beyond the mannerisms of middle-class life. Even with the sketchy background information, it's hard to tell what these people are feeling or what they want."

Pauline Kael of The New Yorker wrote: "The movie is full of talented people, who...are fun to watch, but after a while the scenes that don't point anywhere begin to add up, and you start asking yourself: 'What is this movie about?' You are still asking when it's over, and by then a flatness, a disappointment, is likely to have settled over the fillips you'd enjoyed," noting that "[t]hough Ephron is a gifted and a witty light essayist, her novel is no more than a variant of a princess fantasy: Rachel, the wife, is blameless; Mark, the husband, is simply a bad egg—an adulterer. And, reading the book, you don't have to take Rachel the bratty narrator very seriously; her self-pity is so thinly masked by humor and unabashed mean-spiritedness that you feel that the author is exploiting her life—trashing it by presenting it as a juicy, fast-action comic strip about a marriage of celebrities."

Leonard Maltin gave the film three stars out of a possible four, and wrote "Lightweight, superficial story is supercharged by two charismatic stars, who make it a must see."

Box office
The film opened in 843 theaters in the United States on July 25, 1986, and earned $5,783,079 during its opening weekend, ranking number two at the box office behind Aliens. It eventually grossed a total of $25,314,189 in the US and Canada. Internationally it grossed $27.3 million for a worldwide total of $52.6 million.

Accolades
Streep was named Best Actress at the Valladolid International Film Festival for her performance.

Kevin Spacey makes his film debut in a minor role as a subway thief.

References

External links
 
 
 
 

1986 films
1980s romantic comedy-drama films
Adultery in films
American romantic comedy-drama films
1980s English-language films
Films about marriage
American films based on actual events
Films directed by Mike Nichols
Films produced by Robert Greenhut
Films set in New York City
Films set in Washington, D.C.
Films shot in New York City
Films shot in Virginia
Films shot in Washington, D.C.
Films with screenplays by Nora Ephron
Paramount Pictures films
Films à clef
1986 comedy films
1986 drama films
Biographical films about journalists
1980s American films